Doc Martin is a British medical comedy drama television series starring Martin Clunes as Doctor Martin Ellingham. It was created by Dominic Minghella developing the character of Dr Martin Bamford from the 2000 comedy film Saving Grace. The programme is set in the fictional seaside village of Portwenn and filmed on location in the village of Port Isaac, Cornwall, United Kingdom, with most interior scenes shot in a converted local barn. Fern Cottage is used as the home and surgery of Doctor Ellingham.

Nine series aired between 2004 and 2019, with a television film airing on Christmas Day in 2006. The ninth series aired on ITV from September 2019, and streamed in the United States and Canada on Acorn TV, PlutoTV and Tubi. 

The tenth (and final) series aired from 7 September 2022 to 26 October 2022; one last instalment, a Christmas special that aired on 25 December 2022, was the programme's final episode. On 29 December 2022 a documentary entitled “Farewell Doc Martin” aired on ITV1, featuring behind the scenes interviews with the cast and crew as they filmed the final series. It also looked back at highlights from the 18 years of the show.

Plot

Dr Martin Ellingham (Martin Clunes), a brilliant and successful vascular surgeon at Imperial College London, develops haemophobia – a fear of blood, forcing him to stop practising surgery. He obtains a post as the sole general practitioner (GP) in the sleepy Cornish village of Portwenn, where he had spent childhood holidays with his Aunt Joan (Stephanie Cole) and Uncle Phil, who owns a local farm. Upon arriving in Portwenn – where, to his frustration, the locals address him as "Doc Martin" – he finds the surgery in chaos and inherits an incompetent receptionist, Elaine Denham (Lucy Punch). In series 2–4, she is replaced by Pauline Lamb (Katherine Parkinson), a new receptionist, and later also a phlebotomist. In Series 5, Morwenna Newcross (Jessica Ransom) takes up the post.

The programme revolves around Ellingham's interactions with the local Cornish villagers, and a psychologist attempts to diagnose Doc Martin with Asperger syndrome or schizoid personality traits. Despite his medical excellence, Ellingham is grouchy, abrupt, and lacks social skills. His direct, emotionless manner offends many of the villagers, made worse by his invariably unpleasant responses to their ignorant, often foolish, comments. They perceive him to be hot-tempered and lacking in a bedside manner, whereas he feels he is performing his duties in a professional and by-the-book manner, not wasting time chatting. Ellingham is very deadpan and dresses formally in a business suit and tie, regardless of the weather or the occasion, and he never takes off his jacket, even when delivering babies. He has no hesitation in pointing out the risks of unhealthy behaviours (eg. smoking), both in private and in public gatherings.

The villagers eventually discover his fear of blood, and the frequent and debilitating bouts of nausea and vomiting it causes. In spite of this handicap, Ellingham proves to be an expert diagnostician and responds effectively to various emergencies in his medical practice; thus, he gradually gains grudging respect from his neighbours.

Ellingham does not get on with his parents, but has a warm relationship with his aunt Joan, who provides emotional support. When she dies after a heart attack, her sister Ruth (Eileen Atkins), a retired psychiatrist, comes to Portwenn to take care of her affairs, and eventually decides to use the village as a permanent retreat, offering Martin the support Joan had provided.

A major theme throughout the series is Ellingham's relationship with primary school teacher (eventually school headmistress) Louisa Glasson (Caroline Catz). Due to his difficulty in expressing feelings and his insensitive nature, the relationship has many ups and downs; though they eventually have a baby and later marry.

Other series regulars are father and son duo Bert and Al Large who are always trying to run a small business of some type; pharmacist Sally Tishell who is infatuated with Martin; and Mark Mylow, a quirky police officer who is replaced in series 3 by the bumbling and inept Joe Penhale.

Regular cast members have characterised Ellingham's personality thus:
Joe Absolom: "The Doctor is ... slightly autistic, probably, on the spectrum."
Martin Clunes: "Lots of people say that he is Aspergic or something to some degree—which yes, I think he is." He has also said, "He's clearly wired the way he's wired, but growing up being loathed by both your parents is going to leave a footprint. That's why he's so dysfunctional with relationships, 'cause there's gaps in his makeup. There's a sad little boy in there that comes out a lot, and that's what a lot of that frowning is."
Eileen Atkins: "He's unable to connect with people. He just can't understand why people can't just take the truth, in a rather rough manner. If your parents have been very cold towards you and just factual, then that's very hard for you to grow up being—'loving' is too strong a word—an affectionate person."

Cast and characters

Final main cast

 Martin Clunes as Martin Ellingham – village GP "Doc" Martin has no bedside manner. He despises small talk, and is straightforward with patients, delivering his diagnoses and advice without trying to protect their feelings, though he is genuinely concerned about their health. Clunes also plays Martin's father in a flashback to Martin's childhood in one episode.
 Caroline Catz as Louisa Ellingham (née Glasson) – teacher at Portwenn Primary School, later becomes school headmistress
 Ian McNeice as Bert Large – plumber and local entrepreneurial businessman
 Joe Absolom as Al Large – Bert's son, who works in a variety of jobs during the series
 Selina Cadell as Sally Tishell – pharmacist, who overtly displays unrequited romantic feelings about Ellingham
 John Marquez as Joe Penhale (series 3–10) – police officer Penhale greatly admires Ellingham, and believes they have a great working relationship, an optimistic assessment not shared by the doctor.  Penhale has proudly referred to Ellingham and himself as "The Dynamic Duo".
 Eileen Atkins as Ruth Ellingham (series 5–10) – retired forensic psychiatrist, who is also one of Martin's aunts
 Jessica Ransom as Morwenna Large (née Newcross) (Series 5–10) – surgery receptionist

Previous main cast
 Stephanie Cole as Joan Norton – Martin's aunt (series 1–4)
 Stewart Wright as Mark Mylow –  police constable, later promoted to sergeant (series 1–2, one episode in series 9)
 Lucy Punch as Elaine Denham – the original surgery receptionist (series 1)
 Katherine Parkinson as Pauline Lamb – surgery receptionist (series 2–4)

Other previous cast

Original character 
Martin Clunes originally played a character called Dr Martin Bamford in the 2000 film Saving Grace—written by Mark Crowdy and Craig Ferguson—and its two made-for-TV prequels, Doc Martin and Doc Martin and the Legend of the Cloutie, which were made by British Sky Broadcasting (BSkyB). The prequels show Bamford as a successful obstetrician, rather than a surgeon, who finds out that his wife has been carrying on extramarital affairs behind his back. After confronting her with his discovery, he escapes London and heads for Port Isaac, a small coastal town in Cornwall which he remembers fondly from his youth. Shortly after he arrives, he is involved in the mystery of the "Jellymaker" and, following the departure of the village's resident GP, decides to stay and fill the vacancy. In these three films the village is not known as Portwenn.

The Martin Bamford character is friendly and laid-back, seeming to enjoy his retreat from the career pressures and conflicts he left behind in London.  He drinks and smokes carelessly, including a mild illegal drug, and has no problem getting his hands and clothes dirty by temporarily working as a lobster and crab fisherman aboard a local boat.

The original deal had been to produce two television films per year for three years, but Sky Pictures folded after the first two episodes were made, so Clunes's company tried to sell the franchise to ITV.  The new network felt that the doctor character should be portrayed as a "townie", a fish out of water who is uncomfortable in the countryside. They also wanted something darker, so Clunes suggested that the doctor be curmudgeonly, socially inept, and formal. The new doctor's surname was changed to Ellingham, an anagram of the last name of the new writer, Dominic Minghella, who was brought in to rework the doctor's background and create a new cast of supporting characters.

Apart from Clunes, the only actors to appear in both versions of Doc Martin are Tristan Sturrock and Tony Maudsley.

Episodes

Ten series totalling 79 episodes aired on ITV in the UK between 2004 and 2022. Episodes are just under 50 minutes long, except for the 2006 TV film which is 92 minutes, and the 2022 Christmas special. In the US, American Public Television provided the 2006 TV film as a two-part episode, with the second episode airing a week after the first.
In April 2020 director Nigel Cole confirmed plans for a tenth and final series, which aired in Autumn 2022.

Reception

Ratings
In the UK, Doc Martin has been a ratings success for ITV, with the third series achieving ITV's best midweek drama performance in the 9pm Monday slot since December 2004. The final episode of the third series was watched by 10.37 million viewers, which is the programme's highest-ever viewing figure for a single episode.

In 2009, Doc Martin was moved to a 9pm Sunday time slot for the broadcast of Series 4. That change meant that it followed-on from ITV's The X Factor programme. Series 4 ratings were adversely affected by STV not screening the majority of ITV drama productions in Scotland. The final episode of Series 4 had ratings of 10.29 million viewers. STV went back on its decision not to screen ITV drama in Scotland. Series 4 of Doc Martin was broadcast on Sunday afternoons in August 2011.

Accolades
In 2004, Doc Martin won the British Comedy Award for "Best TV Comedy Drama", having also been nominated as "Best New TV Comedy". In the same year, Martin Clunes won the "Best TV Comedy Actor" award, primarily for his portrayal of Doc Martin.

Adaptations

Czech Republic and Slovakia 
In 2014, Czech Television and RTVS began filming their own TV series starring Miroslav Donutil, which is heavily inspired by the original British series. The series started to air from 30 August 2015 in Slovakia and from 4 September 2015 in Czechia. The Czech version is set in the Beskydy mountains, which is a picturesque area in the east of the Czech Republic on the border with Slovakia; like Portwenn, it is a long way from the capital, Prague, and dependent on the tourist industry.

France 
French television producers Ego Productions, in cooperation with TF1, have produced a French version of the series starring Thierry Lhermitte as Dr Martin Le Foll, with the series based in the fictional Breton town of Port-Garrec and filmed in Finistère. The series was broadcast on TF1 from 10 January 2011 to 27 April 2015.

Germany 
In Germany, Doktor Martin, an adaptation of the original series, airs on ZDF with Axel Milberg as Doktor Martin Helling, a surgeon from Berlin. The counterpart of Portwenn was the real North Sea coastal village of Neuharlingersiel in East Frisia.

Greece 
In Greece, Kliniki Periptosi, an adaptation of the original series filmed in the Ionian Seaside town of Kardamyli, was aired in November 2011 on Mega Channel with Yannis Bezos as Markos Staikos, a surgeon from New York.

Netherlands 
In the Netherlands Dokter Tinus based on the original series began airing in late August 2012 on SBS6, with the main role being played by actor Thom Hoffman. The series was shot in Woudrichem on the Waal riverside.

Russia 
A Russian version is mentioned in the Series 5 DVD bonus material. Since 2 September series Doc Martin shows OTR (TV Channel).

Spain 
Notro Films produced a Spanish version under the title Doctor Mateo for Antena 3 Televisión. The lead role of Dr. Mateo Sancristobal was played by Gonzalo de Castro. It aired in 2009 and was shot in Lastres, Asturias, called the fictional village of San Martín del Sella.

Home media

Series 1, 2 and 3 and "On the Edge" were released separately in Region 1 and 2 and in the "complete Series 1 to 3" box set. Series 3 was released on 2 February 2010 and Series 4 was released in Region 1 and 2 on 6 July 2010. Series 5 was released in Region 1 on 5 June 2012 and Region 2 on 5 March 2012. A complete boxset of Series 1-5 is also available in Region 2. Series 6 of Doc Martin was released in Region 1 in December 2013 and in the UK (Region 2) on 24 March 2014.
Series 7 of Doc Martin was released on DVD/Blu-ray in Region 1 on 8 December 2015 and in the UK (Region 2) on 16 November 2015.

In Region 4, Series 1, 2, 4, and "On the Edge" were released separately and in a nine-disc boxset entitled "Doc Martin: Comedy Cure", as well as an earlier seven-disc boxset not including Series 4. The two Sky Pictures telefilms were individually released in Region 4 (as "Doc Martin: volume 1" and "Doc Martin: volume 2, the Legend of the Cloutie") on the Magna Pacific label.

In Region 1, Series 1 was released in June 2007 by Image Entertainment of Chatsworth, CA as a 2-DVD set (Catalog No. ID3505PKDVD) simply titled Doc Martin.

Region 4 (Australia) Releases:

Airings beyond the UK
As of 2018, Doc Martin was seen in New Zealand on TVNZ 1, In Iceland on RUV, In Italy on Hallmark Channel from September 2007 (seasons 1-3), Rai 3 from May 2010 and various reruns, and in streaming on RaiPlay, In Australia on Australian Broadcasting Corporation (ABC) network and Foxtel pay-television subscription network via its UK-TV channel and also on various public broadcasting stations around the US and Canada, the showings of which were arranged through syndicator American Public Television. As of 2021, it was streaming on Netflix, PlutoTV and Tubi.

Novelisations
Two novels by Sam Hawksmoor writing as "Sam North," were published by Ebury in 2013. The first, Practice Makes Perfect, adapts the teleplays of series one; the second, Mistletoe and Whine, adapts the teleplays of series two. The author employs some time-line shifting, linked to character internalisation and point of view, so the narratives are not always as linear as in the teleplays.

See also

 Becker, an American TV sitcom series featuring a misanthropic doctor in the Bronx borough of New York City
 Northern Exposure, an American TV sitcom series about a big city internal medicine specialist being sent to an isolated Alaskan village to repay his medical school scholarship
 Doc Hollywood, an American film about a young doctor driving to a job interview in Beverly Hills, who ends up taking over a rural practice in South Carolina after crashing his car there

References

External links

 
 
 
 Doc Martin at British TV Comedy
 Doc Martin home on Google Street View
 Portwenn.com
 Doc Martin Fan Page
 Acorn TV | Doc Martin
 Doc Martin filming locations

 
2004 British television series debuts
2022 British television series endings
2000s British comedy-drama television series
2010s British comedy-drama television series
2020s British comedy-drama television series
2000s British medical television series
2010s British medical television series
2020s British medical television series
British comedy-drama television shows
English-language television shows
Fictional physicians
ITV comedy
ITV television dramas
Television shows set in Cornwall